Dmytro Ilchenko (born 9 July 1996) is a Ukrainian handball player for Górnik Zabrze (handball) and the Ukrainian national team.

He represented Ukraine at the 2020 European Men's Handball Championship.

References

1996 births
Living people
Ukrainian male handball players
Sportspeople from Kyiv
ZTR players
21st-century Ukrainian people